The 2009–10 Sun Belt Conference men's basketball season marks the 33rd season of Sun Belt Conference basketball.

Preseason
Blue Ribbon magazine predicted Western Kentucky University to win the East Division. The Hilltoppers are returning from a season in which they came within one second of upsetting Gonzaga and advancing to the NCAA Sweet Sixteen. In addition, Hilltopper star A.J. Slaughter was named the Preseason Player of the Year.

Sun Belt Preseason Poll
East Division

West Division

Preseason All-SBC Team
G -- Brandon Hazzard (Troy, Sr.)
G -- A. J. Slaughter (WKU, Sr.)
F -- Nate Rohnert (Denver, Sr.)
F -- Eric Tramiel (North Texas, Sr.)
F -- Desmond Yates (Middle Tennessee, Sr.)

Regular season

Non-conference
In terms of upsets over the six major conferences, Western Kentucky beat Vanderbilt University 76-69 on December 11. A.J. Slaughter scored 27 points to lead the Hilltoppers to their first win over Vanderbilt since 1946. Western Kentucky led for the final 16:33 of the game, though Vanderbilt cut the lead to one twice. This was Vanderbilt's second consecutive loss.

Conference season

Postseason

SBC Tournament

References